The Kitos War (115–117; , or  mered ha-tfutzot; "rebellion of the diaspora" ) was one of the major Jewish–Roman wars (66–136). The rebellions erupted in 115, when most of the Roman armies were fighting Trajan's Parthian War on the eastern border of the Roman Empire. Major uprisings by Jews in Cyrenaica, Cyprus and Egypt spiralled out of control, resulting in a widespread slaughter of the remaining Roman garrisons and Roman citizens by Jewish rebels.

The Jewish rebellions were finally crushed by the Roman legions, chiefly by the Roman general Lusius Quietus, whose nomen later gave the conflict its title, as Kitos is a later corruption of Quietus. Some localities were left so utterly annihilated that Romans moved in to settle the areas to prevent their complete depopulation. The Jewish leader, Lukuas, fled to Judea. Marcius Turbo pursued him and sentenced to death the brothers Julian and Pappus, who had been key leaders in the rebellion.

Lusius Quietus, the conqueror of the Jews of Mesopotamia, was now in command of the Roman army in Judea and laid siege to Lydda, where the rebel Jews had gathered under the leadership of Julian and Pappus. Lydda was next taken, and many of the rebellious Jews were executed. The "slain of Lydda" are often mentioned in words of reverential praise in the Talmud. The rebel leaders Pappus and Julian were among those who were executed by the Romans that year.

The situation in Judea remained tense for the Romans, who were obliged under Hadrian to move the Legio VI Ferrata permanently into Caesarea Maritima in Judea.

Background

Tension between the Jewish population of the Roman Empire and the Greek and Roman populations mounted over the course of the 1st century CE, gradually escalating with various violent events, mainly throughout Judea (Iudaea), where parts of the Judean population occasionally erupted into violent insurrections against the Roman Empire. Several incidents also occurred in other parts of the Empire, most notably the Alexandria pogroms, targeting the large Jewish community of Alexandria in the province of Egypt. However, with the exception of Alexandria, the Jewish diaspora fared well throughout the Roman Empire and relied on the Roman state for maintaining their rights.

The escalation of tensions finally erupted as the First Jewish–Roman War, which began in the year 66 CE. Initial hostilities were due to Greek and Jewish religious tensions, but later escalated due to anti-taxation protests and attacks upon Roman citizens. The Roman military garrison of Judea was quickly overrun by rebels and the pro-Roman king Herod Agrippa II fled Jerusalem, together with Roman officials, to Galilee. Cestius Gallus, the legate of Syria, brought the Syrian army, based on XII Fulminata, reinforced by auxiliary troops, to restore order and quell the revolt. The legion, however, was ambushed and defeated by Jewish rebels at the Battle of Beth Horon, a result that shocked the Roman leadership.

The suppression of the revolt was then handed to general Vespasian and his son Titus, who assembled four legions and began advancing through the country, starting with Galilee, in the year 67 CE. The revolt ended when legions under Titus besieged and destroyed the center of rebel resistance in Jerusalem in the year 70 CE and defeated the remaining Jewish strongholds later on.

Revolt and warfare
In 115, Emperor Trajan was in command of the eastern campaign against the Parthian Empire. The Roman invasion had been prompted by the imposition of a pro-Parthian king in the Kingdom of Armenia after the Parthians invaded it. That encroachment on the traditional sphere of influence of the Roman Empire (both empires had shared hegemony over Armenia since the time of Nero some 50 years earlier) necessarily led to war.

As Trajan's army advanced victoriously through Mesopotamia, Jewish rebels in its rear began attacking the small garrisons left behind. A revolt in far-off Cyrenaica soon spread to Egypt and then Cyprus and incited revolt in Judea. A widespread uprising, centred on Lydda, threatened grain supplies from Egypt to the front. The Jewish insurrection swiftly spread to the recently-conquered provinces. Cities with substantial Jewish populations, Nisibis, Edessa, Seleucia and Arbela (now Erbil, Iraq) joined the rebellion and slaughtered their small Roman garrisons.

Cyrenaica
In Cyrenaica, the rebels were led by Lukuas or Andreas, who called himself "king", according to Eusebius of Caesarea. His group destroyed many temples, including those to Hecate, Jupiter, Apollo, Artemis and Isis, as well as the civil structures that were symbols of Rome, including the Caesareum, the basilica and the public baths.

The 4th-century Christian historian Orosius records that the violence so depopulated the province of Cyrenaica that new colonies had to be established by Hadrian:
The Jews... waged war on the inhabitants throughout Libya in the most savage fashion, and to such an extent was the country wasted that, its cultivators having been slain, its land would have remained utterly depopulated, had not the Emperor Hadrian gathered settlers from other places and sent them thither, for the inhabitants had been wiped out.

Dio Cassius states of Jewish insurrectionaries: Meanwhile the Jews in the region of Cyrene had put one Andreas at their head and were destroying both the Romans and the Greeks. They would cook their flesh, make belts for themselves of their entrails, anoint themselves with their blood, and wear their skins for clothing. Others they would give to wild beasts and force still others to fight as gladiators. In all, consequently, two hundred and twenty thousand perished. In Egypt, also, they performed many similar deeds, and in Cyprus under the leadership of Artemio. There, likewise, two hundred and forty thousand perished. For this reason no Jew may set foot in that land, but even if one of them is driven upon the island by force of the wind, he is put to death. Various persons took part in subduing these Jews, one being Lusius, who was sent by Trajan.
Dio's records, however, have caused considerable skepticism, given that some of them strongly remind of the centuries-old blood libel against Jews.

The original 1906 Jewish Encyclopedia stated on the Cyrene massacres: By this outbreak Libya was depopulated to such an extent that a few years later new colonies had to be established there (Eusebius, "Chronicle" from the Armenian, fourteenth year of Hadrian). Bishop Synesius, a native of Cyrene in the early 5th century, said of the devastations wrought by the Jews ("Do Regno," p. 2).

The Jewish Encyclopedia acknowledged Dio Cassius's importance as a source but believed that his accounts of the actions at Cyrene and on Cyprus may have been embellished: For an account of the Jewish war under Trajan and Hadrian Dion is the most important source (lxviii. 32, lxix. 12–14), though his descriptions of the cruelties perpetrated by the Jews at Cyrene and on the island of Cyprus are probably exaggerated.

The physical destruction of Cyrene, however, was significant enough that Hadrian had to completely rebuild the city at the beginning of his reign according to archaeological findings.

After the war ended, laws were placed ordering the exile of Jews from Cyrene, which Renzo De Felice said "reduced the [Jewish] community of Cyrene to insignificance and set it on the road to inevitable decline." According to De Felice many of the Jews expelled joined Berber tribes, particularly those around modern-day Sirte.

Egypt
Lukuas led the rebels toward Alexandria. He entered the city, which had been abandoned by Roman Governor Marcus Rutilius Lupus, and set fire to it. The Egyptian temples and the tomb of Pompey were destroyed. Jewish rebels reportedly also prevailed in a battle at Hermopolis in 116, as indicated in a papyrus.

Trajan sent new troops under the praefectus praetorio Marcius Turbo, but Egypt and Cyrenaica were pacified only in autumn 117.

Cyprus
In Cyprus a Jewish band, led by Artemion, took control of the island and killed tens of thousands of Cypriot Greek civilians. The Cypriot Jews participated in the great uprising against the Romans under Trajan in 117 and massacred, according to Dio, 240,000 Greeks. A Roman army was dispatched to the island and soon reconquered the capital. After the revolt had been fully defeated, laws were created that forbade any Jews from living on the island. This law extended to the point where Jewish shipwreck survivors would be punished for trying to seek safety on Cypriot shores.

Mesopotamia
A new revolt sprang up in Mesopotamia while Trajan was in the Persian Gulf. Trajan reconquered Nisibis (Nusaybin in Turkey), Edessa, the capital of Osroene, and Seleucia (Iraq), each of which housed large Jewish communities.

A pro-Roman son of the Parthian king Osroes I, Parthamaspatas, had been brought on the expedition as part of the emperor's entourage. Trajan had him crowned in Ctesiphon as king of the Parthians. Cassius Dio described the event:  "Trajan, fearing that the Parthians, too, might begin a revolt, desired to give them a king of their own. Accordingly, when he came to Ctesiphon, he called together in a great plain all the Romans and likewise all the Parthians that were there at the time; then he mounted a lofty platform, and after describing in grandiloquent language what he had accomplished, he appointed Parthamaspates king over the Parthians and set the diadem upon his head". Then, Trajan moved north to take personal command of the ongoing siege of Hatra.

The siege continued throughout the summer of 117, but the years of constant campaigning in the baking eastern heat had taken their toll on Trajan, who suffered a heatstroke. He decided to begin the long journey back to Rome in order to recover. Sailing from Seleucia, the emperor's health deteriorated rapidly. He was taken ashore at Selinus in Cilicia, where he died, and his successor, Hadrian, assumed the reins of government shortly thereafter.

Judea

The Jewish leader, Lukuas, fled to Judea. Marcius Turbo pursued him and sentenced to death the brothers Julian and Pappus, who had been key leaders in the rebellion. Lusius Quietus, the conqueror of the Jews of Mesopotamia, was now in command of the Roman army in Judea and laid siege to Lydda, where the rebel Jews had gathered under the leadership of Julian and Pappus. The distress became so great that the patriarch Rabban Gamaliel II, who was shut up there and died soon afterwards, permitted fasting even on Ḥanukkah. Other rabbis condemned that measure.

Lydda was then taken, and many of the rebellious Jews were executed; the "slain of Lydda" are often mentioned in words of reverential praise in the Talmud. The rebel leaders Pappus and Julian were among those executed by the Romans that year, and became martyrs among the Jews.

Lusius Quietus, whom Trajan had held in high regard and who had served Rome so well, was quietly stripped of his command once Hadrian had secured the imperial title. He was murdered in unknown circumstances in the summer of 118, possibly by the orders of Hadrian.

Hadrian took the unpopular decision to end the war, abandon many of Trajan's eastern conquests and stabilise the eastern borders. Although he abandoned the province of Mesopotamia, he installed Parthamaspates, who had been ejected from Ctesiphon by the returning Osroes, as king of a restored Osroene. For a century, Osroene would retain a precarious independence as a buffer state between both empires.

The situation in Judea remained tense for the Romans, who were obliged under Hadrian to move the Legio VI Ferrata permanently into Caesarea Maritima, in Judea.

Aftermath

Further developments occurred in Judea Province in 130, when Hadrian visited the Eastern Mediterranean and, according to Cassius Dio, made the decision to rebuild the ruined city of Jerusalem as the Roman colonia of Aelia Capitolina, derived from his own name. That decision, together with Hadrian's other sanctions against the Jews, was allegedly one of the reasons for the eruption of the 132 Bar Kokhba revolt, an extremely violent uprising that stretched Roman military resources to the limit. The rebellion ended with an unprecedented onslaught of Judean population and a ban upon the Jewish practices, which was lifted only in 138, upon Hadrian's death.

See also 
 Jewish revolt against Heraclius
 List of conflicts in the Near East
 Samaritan revolts

References

External links 
"BAR KOKBA AND BAR KOKBA WAR" article from Jewish Encyclopedia (public domain)
"Cyprus: In Roman Times" article from Jewish Encyclopedia (public domain)
"Cyrene" article from Jewish Encyclopedia (public domain)
 "The revolt against Trajan", at livius.org
Nicene and Post-Nicene Fathers, Eusebius, Ecclesiastical History, 4.2.

110s conflicts
110s in the Roman Empire
115
116
117
2nd-century Judaism
2nd-century rebellions
Jewish–Roman wars
Religion-based wars